Rotary Stadium is a multi-use stadium in Mthatha, Eastern Cape, South Africa. It is currently used mostly for football matches and is the home ground of Mthata Liverpool F.C.

References

Sports venues in the Eastern Cape
Soccer venues in South Africa